Signe Bro (born 5 March 1999) is a Danish swimmer. She competed in the women's 200 metre freestyle event at the 2017 World Aquatics Championships.

In 2019, she represented Denmark at the 2019 World Aquatics Championships held in Gwangju, South Korea. She competed in the women's 100 metre freestyle event and she did not advance to compete in the semi-finals. She also competed in two relay events, without winning a medal.

Bro participated in the International Swimming League in 2020, for the US-based team, New York Breakers.

References

External links
 

1999 births
Living people
Danish female freestyle swimmers
Place of birth missing (living people)
European Aquatics Championships medalists in swimming
European Games competitors for Denmark
Swimmers at the 2015 European Games
Swimmers at the 2020 Summer Olympics
Olympic swimmers of Denmark
20th-century Danish women
21st-century Danish women